On June 18–19, 1972, Hurricane Agnes generated the third-deadliest tropical cyclone-related tornado outbreak in the United States since 1900, as well as the deadliest such tornado outbreak on record in Florida. The outbreak lasted about 38 hours and produced at least 19 confirmed tornadoes, though some studies suggested nearly a dozen more. Two of the tornadoes killed a total of seven people and were not classified as tornadoes by the National Weather Service until 2018. In Florida alone, the outbreak inflicted at least 135 injuries and destroyed 15 homes, while 119 homes received damage. Statewide, 217 trailers were destroyed and 196 trailers incurred damage. Additionally, six businesses were destroyed, while six others were damaged.

Background

The interaction of baroclinic features with Agnes resulted in a tropical cyclone with "hybrid" characteristics, which increased the threat of strong tornadoes with longer path lengths. The outbreak became the most significant tornado outbreak associated with a tropical cyclone prior to landfall. The presence of strong wind shear surrounding the tropical cyclone facilitated the development of strong tornadoes, including the greatest number of tornadoes of at least F2 intensity within one 24-hour period in Florida. Studies have suggested strong wind shear in the lower levels of the atmosphere is a common feature during tornado outbreaks involving the outer rain bands of tropical cyclones near Florida. Additionally, in Florida cases, the favored region for tornado outbreaks is the northeastern quadrant of northward-moving tropical cyclones. Agnes represented one of these cases.

Daily statistics

Confirmed tornadoes

A number of undocumented tornadoes were located in 2002, but were overlooked at the time of the outbreak. Most of these remain unlisted in official records. For example, a brief tornado struck Everglades City. Additionally, a brief tornado damaged a roof and two airplanes in the town of Immokalee. Power lines were downed in the area.

June 18 event

June 19 event

See also

List of tornadoes and tornado outbreaks
List of North American tornadoes and tornado outbreaks
List of tropical cyclone-spawned tornadoes

Notes

References

Sources

 

 

H
H
H
H
Hurricane Agnes Tornado Outbreak, 1972|H
1972 in Florida
June 1972 events in the United States